The Lambretta TV200 (or GT200 in the UK) was a motor scooter produced by Innocenti from April 1963 to October 1965.  During this time, 14,982 units were made for and exported to markets outside of Italy.

External links
TV200.info – Lambretta TV200 Information and Registry

Motor scooters
Innocenti vehicles
Motorcycles introduced in 1963